ABT-436 is an orally active, highly selective vasopressin V1B receptor antagonist which was under development by Abbott Laboratories and AbbVie for the treatment of major depressive disorder, anxiety disorders, and alcoholism but was discontinued. It reached phase II clinical trials prior to the discontinuation of its development.

See also 
 Balovaptan
 Nelivaptan
 SRX-246
 TS-121

References 

Abandoned drugs
Antidepressants
Anxiolytics
AbbVie brands
Drugs with undisclosed chemical structures
Vasopressin receptor antagonists